The Liberty Highway was an auto trail in the United States linking New York City with Cleveland, Ohio. It passed through Binghamton, New York; Elmira, New York; Jamestown, New York; and Erie, Pennsylvania. First signed in 1918, it was named after the village of Liberty, New York.

Through New Jersey and New York, the route of the Liberty Highway was designated as Route 17. Today, much of these routes have been bypassed by freeways, most notably by Interstate 86. Throughout much of the Catskills and the Southern Tier of New York, old portions of the road are still named Liberty Highway or Old Route 17.

History 
The moniker "Liberty Highway" was first given by R. H. Johnson, who was the manager of the New York branch of the White Motorcar Company. Because well-known highways like the Liberty Highway were clogged with traffic, he studied maps and found a more direct route through the Southern Tier, which was better maintained and far less traveled. He christened it after Liberty, New York, through which the route travels, and to the "spirit of the times".

Johnson first published his route in Motor Age Magazine. Further publicity was brought by other publications, and a film commissioned by Johnson. The Liberty Highway Association was formed in 1919 to further promote the route.

Beginning with the designation of Route 17 over the highway in New York in 1924, the Liberty Highway label began to fall out of fashion, though it was still being advertised as late as 1928 by the AAA. When Route 17 began to be upgraded to a freeway, the Liberty Highway was long forgotten.

First routing

Manhattan 

 Dyckman Street, 10th Avenue to Englewood Ferry

New Jersey 

 Henry Hudson Drive, Englewood Ferry through Englewood Cliffs
 County Route 505, Englewood Cliffs to Englewood
 Bennet Road
 Englewood Avenue
 Bergen County Route 37
 Bergen County Route 64 into Teaneck
 Queen Anne Road
 Bergen County Route 60 into Hackensack
 Bergen County Route 62, Hackensack to Ho-Ho-Kus
 County Route 507, Ridgewood to New York line at Mahwah

New York

Rockland County 

 U.S. Route 202, New Jersey line at Suffern
 New York State Route 59, Suffern to Hillburn
 New York State Route 17, Hillburn to Orange County Line

Orange County 

 New York State Route 17, Rockland County Line to Harriman
 New York State Route 17M, Harriman to Fair Oaks
 Main Street through Harriman
 Main Street, Hambletonian Avenue, Ward Road through Chester
 Old Chester Road, Church Street, Main Street through Goshen
 Denton Hill Road, Sly Place through New Hampton
 Academy Avenue and North Street through Middletown

Sullivan County 

 Sullivan County Routes 170-179, Fair Oaks to Rockland
 Old Liberty Road through Rockland

Delaware County 

 Delaware County Route 17, Rockland to Hancock
 Cooks Falls Road through Cooks Falls
 New York State Route 17, Hancock to Deposit Town
 Bush Hilltop Road through Deposit
 Lower Hale Eddy Road through Deposit
 Hale Eddy Road through Hale Eddy
 New York State Route 8, Deposit Town into Deposit
 Oak Street, Pine Street, through Deposit, Deposit Town
 Second Street, from Deposit, Deposit Town to Deposit, Sanford Town

Broome County 

 Broome County Route 28, Deposit, Sanford Town to West Windsor
 Quickway through Kirkwood
 Foley Road, West Windsor to Kirkwood
 U.S. Route 11, Kirkwood to Binghamton
 Industrial Park Road, Barlow Road through Kirkwood
 New York State Route 17C, Binghamton to Tioga County Line
 Watson Boulevard, River Road, Pelican Lane, Kent Avenue through Endicott

Tioga County 

 New York State Route 17C, Broome County Line to Waverly
 Belknap Road, Owego
 Tioga County Route 106, Waverly to Chemung County Line

Chemung County 

 Chemung County Route 60, Waverly to Elmira Town
 New York State Route 17, Elmira Town
 New York State Route 352, Elmira
 Madison Avenue, Lake Street, Elmira to Horseheads
 New York State Route 17, Horseheads
 Chemung County Route 64, Horseheads to Big Flats
 New York State Route 352, Big Flats to Steuben County Line

Steuben County 

 New York State Route 352, Chemung County Line to Corning Town
 Old State Avenue, College Avenue, Corning Town to Corning
 Market Street, Pine Street Bridge, Center Way, Corning
 New York State Route 415, Corning to Painted Post
 New York State Route 417†, Painted Post to Jasper
 Steuben County Route 79, Gang Mills
 Old State Road, Old State Highway 17, Oak Road, Tuscarora
 Woodhull-East Woodhull Road, Mill Street, Main Street, Jasper Street, Woodhull
 Old State Road, Jasper
 New York State Route 36†, Jasper to Hornell
 Dineen Road, Canisteo
 McBurney Road, Hornell Road, Hornellsville
 Canisteo Street, Seneca Street, Hornell
 New York State Route 21†, Hornell to Allegany County Line
 Almond Road, Hornell to Hornellsville

Allegany County 

 New York State Route 21†, Steuben County Line to Andover
 Old Whitney Road, Almond
 Whitford Road, Almond to Alfred Town
 Shaw Road, Alfred to Alfred Station
 Hardy Hill Road, Water Street, Main Street, through Andover
 New York State Route 417†, Andover to Wellsville
 Jackson Road, Dyke Road, Andover
 State Street, Main Street, Wellsville
 New York State Route 19†, Wellsville to Belvidere
 Allegany County Route 20, Belvidere to Cuba
 Hubble Hill Road, Cuba Town
 Main Street, Cuba
 New York State Route 305, Cuba
 New York State Route 446, Cuba to Cattaraugus County Line

Cattaraugus County 

 New York State Route 446, Allegany County Line to Hinsdale
 New York State Route 16, Hinsdale to Olean
 Old Route 16, Main Street, Hinsdale
 Old Route 16, Main Street, Olean
 New York State Route 417†, Olean to Jimersontown
 First Street, Creekside Drive, Old State Road, Blair Road, Allegany
 Center Street, Front Avenue, Salamanca
 New York State Reference Route 951T†, Jimersontown to Steamburg

The former Liberty Highway still exists but is closed to traffic between Red House and Steamburg

 New York State Route 394, Steamburg to Chautauqua County Line

Chautauqua County 

 New York State Route 394, Cattaraugus County Line to Jamestown
 Carter Street, Lindquist Street, Poland
 Second Street, Third Street, Washington Street, Jamestown
 New York State Route 430†, Jamestown to Mayville
 Chautauqua County Route 126, Ellicot
 Lakeside Drive, Bemus Point to Ellery
 Sunset Bay Drive, Ellery
 New York State Route 394†, Mayville to Westfield
 U.S. Route 20, Westfield to Pennsylvania Line at Ripley
 Old Route 20, Forsyth Road, Ripley

Pennsylvania 

 U.S. Route 20, New York line at North East Township to the Ohio Line at Springfield
 Stinson Road, Old Buffalo Road, North East Township
 Buffalo Road, 18th Street, State Street, Erie
 East Main Street, East Springfield

Ohio 

 U.S. Route 20, Pennsylvania Line at Conneaut to Cleveland
 Old Main Street, Main Street, Conneaut
 State Road, 46th Street, Edgewood
 46th Street, Main Avenue, Center Street, Ashtabula
 West Main Street, Geneva
 Red Mill Valley Road, North Perry
 Ohio Route 640, Willoughby to Willowick
 Ohio Route 283, Willowick to Cleveland
 Saint Claire Avenue, 9th Street, Superior Avenue, Cleveland

 Second-order bullet points indicate parts of the main route that were re-routed as the highway was upgraded
 †Former routing of New York State Route 17. As Route 17 was reassigned, the Liberty Highway designation was moved onto these new segments.

Later additions 
As late as 1928, the highway association added other roads to its system, including realignments of Route 17. The following names are descriptive, rather than official monikers.

Chautauqua Branch 

 New York State Route 394, Mayville to Chautauqua

Little Valley Loop 

 New York State Route 242, East Randolph to Town of Little Valley
 New York State Route 353, Town of Little Valley to Salamanca
 Kilburne Corners Road, Town of Little Valley

Bath Loop 

 Seneca Road, Hornell to North Hornell
 Steuben County Route 70A, North Hornell to Avoca Town
 New York State Route 415, Avoca to
 River Road, Main Street, Kanoka
 Spaulding Drive, Bath
 West Morris Street, West Steuben Street, Bath Village
 Babcock Hollow Road, Selleck Road, Coon Road, Utegg Road, Scudder Road, Bath
 Little Acorn Lane, Maple Lane, Savona
 Steuben County Route 125, Savona to Campbell
 Steuben County Route 333, Campbell to Campbell Town
 Barringer Road, Main Street, Coopers Plains

Watkins Glen Loop 

 New York State Route 226, Savona to North Reading
 Round Lake Road, Bath to Bradford
 Old State Road, Yawger Hill Road, Bradford to Orange
 Schuyler County Route 23A, Church Hill Road, Schuyler County Route 23, Tyrone
 New York State Route 14A, North Reading to Reading
 Altay Road, Schuyler Airfield, Station Hill Spur, NY 14A-14 Connection, Reading
 New York State Route 14, Reading to Horseheads
 Reading Road, State Point Road, Watkins Glen
 North Genesee Street, West Main Street, Owego Street, Montour Falls
 South Genesee Street, Hanrahan Road, Montour
 Rodabaugh Spur, Veteran
 Highland Avenue, Stafford Road, Old Route 14, Millport
 Watkins Road, Grand Central Avenue, Horseheads

Susquehanna River South Bank Loop 

 New York State Route 96, Owego
 New York State Route 434, Owego to Binghamton
 Degroat Road, Town of Owego
 Main Street, Apalachin
 Owego Road, Town of Owego to Vestal
 Castle Gardens Road, Front Street, North Main Street, Old Vestal Road, Vestal
 Vestal Avenue, Washington Street, Binghamton

Port Jervis Loop 

 New York State Route 42, Monticello to Port Jervis
 Schoolhouse Road, Thompson
 St. Joseph's Hill Road, Forestburgh
 Hagen Road, Bolton Basin Road, Deerpark
 Main Street, Berme Road, Sparrow Bush
 Grandview Avenue, West Main Street, Port Jervis
 Pike Street, Front Street, Jersey Avenue, Port Jervis
 U.S. Route 6, Port Jervis to Wawayanda
 Greenville Turnpike, Greenville
 Castle High Road, Wawayanda

Hudson River East Bank Loop 

 New York State Route 17, Woodbury to Harriman
 New York State Route 32, Harriman to Woodbury
 Maher Road, Woodbury
 Estrada Road, Old U.S. 6, Woodbury
 U.S. Route 6, Woodbury to Peekskill
 Various unnamed realignments through Harriman and Bear Mountain State Parks
 U.S. Route 9, Peekskill to Manhattan
 Lower South Street, Albany Post Road, New York State Route 9A, Old Post Road North, Peekskill to Crotonville

See also 

 Auto trail

References 

Auto trails in the United States
Historic trails and roads in New Jersey
Historic trails and roads in New York (state)
Historic trails and roads in Pennsylvania
Historic trails and roads in Ohio
U.S. Route 20